Kanembu is a Nilo-Saharan language spoken in Chad by the Kanembu people. It is closely related to Kanuri.

Writing system
Kanembu is written with the Latin script alphabet.

The letters  are also used. The orthography also uses the digraphs .

The Ajami script was used for Kanembu, since the time of Dunama Dabbalemi, and still today in the Tarjumo language or in religious works.

Notes

References

External links
PanAfriL10n page on Kanuri (includes Kanembu)
"http://kanembou.net – photos and language recordings"
Old Kanembu Islamic Manuscripts

Saharan languages
Languages of Chad